Elections for the whole of Telford and Wrekin Council took place on 10 May 2011. 54 councillors were elected in 33 wards and the Labour Party took control from the Conservatives. There were no boundary changes taking effect at this election.

Election result
The Conservatives lost control to Labour, who gained 16 seats.

Seat gains/losses are in relation to the previous whole council election in 2007. During the intervening time, four seats changes hands in by-elections; the Conservatives gained four seats, 2 losses each from Labour and Independents.

Ward results
Successful candidates are in bold; defending incumbents are indicated by "*". Percentages are of the total number of votes cast (In multiple member wards, each voter may vote once for each vacancy, i.e., in a three-member ward each voter has three votes).

References

External links
Summary of result

2011 English local elections
2011
21st century in Shropshire